This is a list collecting the most notable films produced in Hungary and in the Hungarian language during 1901–1948.

While the first years of the Hungarian cinema were in its infancy with mostly experimental films and short comedic sketches mostly conducted by enterprising hobbyists, by 1940 a large industry grew out of their footsteps, with famed film star idols and film studios. After World War II, a different kind of purpose found its way to movie making: full-length movies began to be used for political purposes.

For an alphabetical list of articles on Hungarian films see :Category:Hungarian films.

1901–1947

1900s

1910s

1920s

1930s

1940s

References

External links
 Hungarian film at the Internet Movie Database

1901